The Royal Borough of Greenwich (or ) is a London borough in southeast Greater London. The London Borough of Greenwich was formed in 1965 by the London Government Act 1963. The new borough covered the former area of the Metropolitan Borough of Greenwich and part of the Metropolitan Borough of Woolwich to the east. The borough is entirely within the boundaries of the historic county of Kent. The local council is Greenwich London Borough Council which meets in Woolwich Town Hall. The council's offices are also based in Woolwich, the main urban centre in the borough.

Greenwich is the location of the Greenwich prime meridian, on which all Coordinated Universal Time is based. The prime meridian running through Greenwich, and the Greenwich Observatory is where the designation Greenwich Mean Time, or GMT began, and on which all world times are based. In 2012, Greenwich was listed as a top ten global destination by Frommer's – the only UK destination to be listed.

To mark the Diamond Jubilee of Elizabeth II, Greenwich became a Royal Borough on 3 February 2012, due in part to its historic links with the Royal Family, and to its UNESCO World Heritage Site status as home of the Prime Meridian.

History
The London Borough of Greenwich was formed on 1 April 1965 under the terms of the London Government Act 1963. It covered an area formerly administered by the Metropolitan Borough of Greenwich and the Metropolitan Borough of Woolwich, (with the exception of North Woolwich).

The name 'Charlton' was briefly considered for the borough. Greenwich once applied for city status, but was turned down. If the application had been accepted the borough would have been known as the City of Greenwich, similarly to the City of Westminster.

To mark the Diamond Jubilee of Elizabeth II, on 3 February 2012 Greenwich became the fourth Royal Borough, an honour additional to its historic links with the Royal Family, and its status as home of the Prime Meridian and as a UNESCO World Heritage Site.

Geography
The borough lies along the south bank of the River Thames between Deptford and Thamesmead. It has an area of 5,044 hectares. Because of the bends of the river, its waterfront is as long as 8.5 miles. Travelling south away from the waterfront, the ground rises: Shooters Hill in the east and the high ground of Blackheath in the west bookend the borough, Eltham to the south of these hills falls away slightly.

Greenwich is bounded by the London Boroughs of Bexley to the east, Bromley to the south, Lewisham to the west and across the River Thames to the north lie Tower Hamlets, Newham and Barking and Dagenham.

Demographics

The borough's population in 2011 was 254,557. 52.3% of the community defined themselves as White British. The largest minority groups represented were of Black and Asian heritage.

Approximately 44,500 international migrants arrived in the Royal Borough between the years 2001 and 2011. Of these, 25% arrived from EU member states, 24.5% arrived from central and western Africa, and 18.9% arrived from southern Asia. The most common country of birth in this period was Nigeria.

The Royal Borough in 2015 had a general fertility rate of 72.7 live births per 1,000 aged 15–44, higher than the London average of 63.9 and the England average of 62.5.

Ethnicity

Landmarks

Central Greenwich Town contains a UNESCO World Heritage Site centred on Christopher Wren's Royal Naval College and the Old Royal Observatory.

Civic affairs

Mayor
The 1979/80 Mayor was Don Swan.
The 2013/14 Mayor was Angela Cornforth.
The 2014/15 Mayor was M Hayes.
The 2015/16 Mayor was Norman Adams.
The 2016/17 Mayor was Olu Babatola, the first African born individual to be elected to the office.
The 2018/19 Mayor was Councillor Christine May.  

Councillor Denise Hyland was appointed mayor for 2021 to 2022.

Shaped like an astrolabe, the 18-carat gold badge on the Mayor's chain embodies the time-ball on the principal building of the old Greenwich Royal Observatory, the meridian line, and lines of latitude and longitude. The ‘time-ball’ is set with small rubies.

Executive
The Executive is composed of ten Labour members, led by Danny Thorpe (Shooters Hill ward) who has been Leader of the Council since 2018.

Coat of arms

Arms were originally granted to the London Borough by letters patent dated 1 October 1965. Although much of the 1965 design has been retained, the arms have been altered in 2012 by the addition of a representation of the Thames. In addition a crest and supporters were added to the arms.

Twinning
The Royal Borough of Greenwich is twinned with:
  – Reinickendorf, Berlin, Germany (since 1965). The initiative of the twinning with this Berlin borough dates from the times of the Metropolitan Borough of Woolwich. A London telephone box and a red pillar box beside Lake Tegel were gifted by Greenwich borough. A Berlin Buddy Bear in General Gordon Square (Woolwich) commemorates the 50th anniversary of the twinning.
  – Maribor, Slovenia (since 1966). The 50th anniversary of the town twinning with Slovenia's second largest city was celebrated with a ballet performance in Woolwich Town Hall and the revealing of a plaque in the renamed Maribor Park in the Royal Arsenal.
  – Tema, Ghana (since 2000). The town twinning with Tema has led to the opening of Tema's first Information Technology Centre (by the Duke of Edinburgh in 2000), the gifting of a mobile ICT learning centre to Tema (2005), the shipping of a converted Greenwich council passenger services bus, packed with books for school libraries and second-hand computers, as well as regular youth exchanges between Greenwich and Tema.

Politics

Greenwich London Borough Council

Greenwich London Borough Council comprises 51 councillors. The Labour Party currently has an overall majority on the council, holding 43 seats, with the Conservatives holding 8. Labour has had a majority on the council since 1971.

There are 17 wards in Greenwich:
Abbey Wood
Blackheath-Westcombe
Charlton
Coldharbour and New Eltham
Eltham North
Eltham South
Eltham West
Glyndon
Greenwich West
Peninsula
Kidbrooke with Hornfair
Middlepark and Sutcliffe
Plumstead
Shooters Hill
Thamesmead Moorings
Woolwich Common
Woolwich Riverside

Westminster Parliament
The borough contains the constituencies of:
 Eltham
 Erith and Thamesmead (shared with the London Borough of Bexley)
 Greenwich and Woolwich

Since the 1997 General Election, all three are represented by Labour MPs.

Education

Schools

Further education
Greenwich Community College is the main publicly funded provider of further education in the borough, offering a range of academic and vocational courses and qualifications. Anglian College London is a private college offering further and higher education courses to students from around London and overseas.  In September 2013, The Royal Borough of Greenwich Equestrian Centre – a partnership between Hadlow College and the Royal Borough of Greenwich – opened.  At present it offers Level 1 and Level 2 qualifications in horse care, as well as a range of part-time qualifications and a BSc (Hons) degree in Equine Sports Therapy and Rehabilitation. In September 2010 Ravensbourne opened its new campus at Greenwich Peninsula.

Universities
The University of Greenwich main campus is located in the distinctive buildings of the former Royal Naval College. There is a further campus of the university at Avery Hill in Eltham, and also, outside the borough, in Medway. The Faculty of Music of Trinity Laban Conservatoire of Music and Dance (formerly known as Trinity College of Music) is also housed in the buildings of the former Greenwich Hospital.

Sport within the borough
Greenwich Council owns many sports centres and these are operated by Greenwich Leisure Limited (GLL). They also run an outdoor swimming pool, Charlton Lido.

The largest football club in the borough is Charlton Athletic F.C., a professional club playing in the EFL League One, There are two non-League football clubs, Bridon Ropes F.C. and Meridian F.C., who both play in Woolwich at Meridian Sports & Social Club. There are several rugby clubs, most notably Blackheath F.C., who played at Rectory Field for 158 years, moving to Eltham in 2016. Blackheath Cricket Club still plays at Rectory Field.

Greenwich was one of the five host boroughs for the 2012 Summer Olympics and hosted 34 events in nine sports at three venues across the borough. Greenwich Park hosted equestrian events and modern pentathlon; the Royal Artillery Barracks in Woolwich hosted shooting events; and The O2 arena hosted gymnastics and basketball finals.

Transport

River crossings
There are foot tunnels under the River Thames between Greenwich and Island Gardens in the London Borough of Tower Hamlets and between Woolwich and North Woolwich in the London Borough of Newham. The Woolwich Ferry takes vehicle traffic and links the North Circular Road to the South Circular Road which runs through the borough. A cable car crossing linking Greenwich Peninsula to the Royal Docks opened on 28 June 2012.

River transport 
The Thames Clippers commuter ferry service runs from Woolwich to Canary Wharf and the City.

Railway stations
 Abbey Wood
 Blackheath
 Charlton
 Eltham
 Greenwich
 Kidbrooke
 Maze Hill
 Mottingham
 New Eltham
 Plumstead
 Westcombe Park
 Woolwich
 Woolwich Arsenal
 Woolwich Dockyard

All stations except Woolwich are served by Southeastern. Woolwich is served by the Elizabeth line. Abbey Wood is served by both.

Tube/DLR stations
The only London Underground station in the borough is North Greenwich on the Jubilee line. It was opened in 1999 and it is close to the Millennium Dome, which is now The O2. The DLR serves Greenwich more extensively and a list of the stations is below:

 Cutty Sark (DLR)
 Deptford Bridge (DLR)
 Elverson Road (DLR)
 Greenwich (DLR)
 Woolwich Arsenal (DLR)

Travel to work
In March 2011, the main forms of transport that residents used to travel to work were driving a car or van, 17.5% of all residents aged 16–74; train, 10.2%; bus, minibus or coach, 10.2%; underground, metro, light rail, tram, 9.7%; on foot, 4.1%; work mainly at or from home, 2.5%; and bicycle, 1.5%.

Economy

Tourism

Tourism is becoming an increasingly important factor in Greenwich's economy. In 2015, 18.5 million people were expected to visit the borough for a day or more, generating over £1.2 billion; this figure was expected to increase by more than 25% by 2018. Evidence of the tourism boom included the construction of a 452-room InterContinental Hotel near the O2 Arena (opening in 2015). Apart from the many museums and historic buildings in Greenwich town and Greenwich Park, the main tourist attractions are the Cutty Sark, The O2 Arena, the London Cable Car, Eltham Palace (which expected over 100,000 visitors in 2015), Charlton House and the Thames Barrier. In addition, the Royal Arsenal in Woolwich is starting to promote itself as a tourist attraction.

Places

Parks and open spaces

The borough contains the Greenwich Royal Park. A small part of the Metropolitan Green Belt is within the borough.

Entertainment district
The O2 (formerly the Millennium Dome) is located on the Greenwich Peninsula. It includes an indoor arena, a music club, a Cineworld cinema, an exhibition space, piazzas, bars, and restaurants.

Religion

The following table shows the religious identity of residents residing in Greenwich according to the 2021 census.

See also
Greenwich parks and open spaces
Grade I and II* listed buildings in Greenwich
List of public art in Greenwich
Greenwich Heritage Centre
University of Greenwich

References

"The Mayor's Green Procurement Code", Level A1. Retrieved 26 September 2007.

External links 
 Greenwich Council
 Greenwich Conservatives
 Greenwich and Woolwich Labour Party
 Greenwich Liberal Democrats
 Eltham Labour Party
 MP Clive Efford
 Greenwich Young Peoples Council
 Trinity Laban Conservatoire of Music and Dance

 
Greenwich
Greenwich
1965 establishments in the United Kingdom
Places with royal patronage in London